Yellow Aster Butte is a  Skagit Range summit located three miles south of the Canada–United States border, in Whatcom County of Washington state. It is situated within the Mount Baker Wilderness, on land managed by Mount Baker-Snoqualmie National Forest. The nearest higher neighbor is Winchester Mountain,  to the east, and Mount Larrabee is set  to the northeast. The summit offers views of Mount Larrabee, Tomyhoi Peak, American Border Peak, Canadian Border Peak, Mount Shuksan, and Mount Baker. Precipitation runoff on the north side of the mountain drains into Tomyhoi Creek, whereas the west side of the mountain drains into Damfino Creek, and the south slope is drained by Swamp Creek.

Access

The Tomyhoi Lake Trail (#686) is accessed by the Twin Lakes Road (Forest Service #3065 in the North Fork Nooksack area) off of the Mount Baker Highway. The junction with the Yellow Aster Butte Trail (#686.1) is about 1.5 mile from the road.

Climate
Yellow Aster Butte is located in the marine west coast climate zone of western North America. Most weather fronts originate in the Pacific Ocean, and travel northeast toward the Cascade Mountains. As fronts approach the North Cascades, they are forced upward by the peaks of the Cascade Range, causing them to drop their moisture in the form of rain or snowfall onto the Cascades (Orographic lift). As a result, the west side of the North Cascades experiences high precipitation, especially during the winter months in the form of snowfall. Because of maritime influence, snow tends to be wet and heavy, resulting in high avalanche danger. Due to its temperate climate and proximity to the Pacific Ocean, areas west of the Cascade Crest very rarely experience temperatures below  or above . During winter months, weather is usually cloudy, but, due to high pressure systems over the Pacific Ocean that intensify during summer months, there is often little or no cloud cover during the summer. The months July through September offer the most favorable weather for viewing or climbing this peak.

Geology
The North Cascades features some of the most rugged topography in the Cascade Range with craggy peaks, ridges, and deep glacial valleys. Geological events occurring many years ago created the diverse topography and drastic elevation changes over the Cascade Range leading to various climate differences. 

The history of the formation of the Cascade Mountains dates back millions of years ago to the late Eocene Epoch. With the North American Plate overriding the Pacific Plate, episodes of volcanic igneous activity persisted. In addition, small fragments of the oceanic and continental lithosphere called terranes created the North Cascades about 50 million years ago.

During the Pleistocene period dating back over two million years ago, glaciation advancing and retreating repeatedly scoured and shaped the landscape. The U-shaped cross section of the river valleys are a result of recent glaciation. Uplift and faulting in combination with glaciation have been the dominant processes which have created the tall peaks and deep valleys of the North Cascades area.

See also

 Geography of the North Cascades
 Geology of the Pacific Northwest
 List of mountain peaks of Washington (state)

References

External links
 Yellow Aster Butte: weather forecast 
 Yellow Aster Butte Trail: U.S. Forest Service
 Yellow Aster Butte photo: Flickr

Mountains of Washington (state)
Mountains of Whatcom County, Washington
North Cascades
Mount Baker-Snoqualmie National Forest
Cascade Range
North American 1000 m summits